Roswell Gilbert Horr (November 26, 1830 – December 19, 1896) was a politician from the U.S. state of Michigan.

Horr was born in Waitsfield, Vermont and moved with his parents to Lorain County, Ohio, in 1834, where he attended the public schools. He graduated from Antioch College in Yellow Springs, Ohio, in 1857 and was clerk of the court of common pleas of Lorain County from 1857 to 1862 and reelected in 1860. He studied law, was admitted to the bar in 1862, and commenced practice in Elyria, Ohio. Horr moved to southeastern Missouri in 1866, where he engaged in mining for six years before moving to East Saginaw, Michigan in 1872.

Horr was elected as a Republican from Michigan's 8th congressional district to the 46th, 47th, and 48th United States Congresses, serving from March 4, 1879 to March 3, 1885. He was an unsuccessful candidate for reelection in 1884. He was a delegate to the Republican National Convention in 1884 and was again an unsuccessful candidate for election in 1886 to the 50th U.S. Congress.

In 1890, Roswell G. Horr moved to New York City and was an associate editor on the staff of the New York Tribune until his death in Plainfield, New Jersey. He was interred in Greenwood Cemetery, in Wellington, Ohio.

References

The Political Graveyard

External links
 

1830 births
1896 deaths
Burials in Ohio
Antioch College alumni
New York (state) Republicans
Republican Party members of the United States House of Representatives from Michigan
19th-century American politicians
Politicians from Saginaw, Michigan
People from Waitsfield, Vermont